Mrigauliya मृगौलिया is a town under Kosi Haraicha Municipality in Morang District in the Kosi Zone in South-Eastern Nepal.  At the time of the 1991 Nepal census it had a population of 10,577 people living in 1977 individual households.

References

Populated places in Morang District